J-Stars was a Dutch ska music band, formed by Johan Steevens and played from 2004 to 2008. Their music is described as up-tempo ska.
Their lyrics are all written in Dutch.

They released their first album, "Skadilemma", in 2005. 
Track list:
1. Sukkel
2. Groot Kind
3. Zoveel
4. Popster
5. Waaien
6. Ziekmelding
7. Niets
8. Skadilemma
9. Op Visite
10. Fanatieke Hond
11. Vergeten
12. Boefke

A year after a live EP followed, simply entitled "LIVE", recorded at Appelpop, Tiel (9 September 2005).
Track list:
1. Skadilemma
2. Altijd Groener
3. Niets
4. Ziekmelding
5. Monsters

In 2006 a second studio album was released, entitled "Onkruid".
Track list:
1. Onkruid
2. Het Beste
3. Lang Geleden
4. De Wereld
5. Onderbreking
6. Altijd Groener
7. Cosa Nostra
8. Gek Genoeg
9. Niets Voor Mij
10. Daar Gaan We Weer
11. Nice Time

Band members
Johan Steevens, guitar, lead vocals
Annemieke Henrichs, trombone, vocals
Sander Loog, saxophone, vocals
George Coenraad, drums, vocals
Pier Borkent, trumpet, vocals
Hidde Roorda, bass
Marco de Lange, keys

Discography
Skadilemma, 2005
Live(EP), 2006
Onkruid, 2006

External links
 Official homepage
 MySpace page

Dutch ska groups